Hello Muddah, Hello Faddah! (A Letter from Camp) is a children's book based on the novelty song "Hello Muddah, Hello Fadduh" by Allan Sherman and Lou Busch, and illustrated by Jack E. Davis.

In the book, a wide-eyed, snaggled-tooth narrator seems befuddled by all the problems at Camp Granada.

References

Fiction about summer camps
Children's fiction books
2004 children's books
American picture books